Eaton's Annex was a 10-storey building containing both retail and office space in Downtown Toronto, Ontario, Canada. It opened in January 1913 and was located at the northwest corner of Albert Street and James Street, west of Eaton's Main Store and north of Toronto's (now former) City Hall.

History

By 1900, the Eaton's department store owned most of the land within the city blocks bordered by Yonge Street, Queen Street, Bay Street and Dundas Street. The land was eventually occupied by the Eaton's Main Store, the Annex building and various Eaton's warehouses and mail-order buildings. The Main Store and the Annex, however, were the only two buildings open to the public. The two buildings were connected by an underground passageway open to both employees and shoppers. It was the first underground pathway in Toronto open to the public, and it is often credited as a historic precursor to Toronto's current downtown PATH network.

When the Annex building opened in 1913 as Eaton's House Furnishing Building, it contained Eaton's housewares and furniture departments. When these departments were moved to the new College Street store in 1930, the focus of the Annex's retail offerings was shifted to lower-cost items.  While the Main Store catered to middle-class budgets, and the College Street store's offerings were more upscale, the Annex store was directed to Toronto's working classes. It offered many of the same departments and types of goods as Eaton's other two Toronto stores, but in cheaper varieties, and with less extensive in-store displays and customer service. As such, the Annex represented one of the first instances in Canada where a traditional, full-line department store operated a separate discount outlet or chain.

The Eaton's Annex and some surrounding warehouses were destroyed by fire on May 9, 1977. The fire was described as "the first of its kind in downtown Toronto since the Great Fire of 1904". Although it destroyed a number of Eaton's buildings and damaged the nearby  Church of the Holy Trinity, it did not significantly affect the newly constructed first phase of the Toronto Eaton Centre.

Legacy
Parts of the Annex building survive as Trinity Square. A portion of the Bell Trinity Square office complex currently occupies the former Annex site.  The same underground passage that formerly linked the Annex and the Main Store now connects the Eaton Centre to the Bell Trinity Centre, and it is part of the PATH network.

In honour of this store, a ski run at the Caledon Ski Club in Caledon, Ontario, was named "Eaton's Annex" after the Eaton family, who were original members of the private club.

Notes

References
Belisle, Donica. Consuming Producers: Retail Workers and Commodity Culture at Eaton's in Mid-Twentieth-Century Toronto, Masters Thesis, Department of History, Queen's University, 2001.
Nasmith, George G., Timothy Eaton,  Toronto: McClelland and Stewart Limited, 1923.
Phenix, Patricia, Eatonians:  The Story of the Family Behind the Family,  Toronto: McClelland and Stewart Limited, 2003.
Santink, Joy L., Timothy Eaton and the Rise of His Department Store, Toronto: University of Toronto Press, 1990.
Scribe, The, Golden Jubilee 1869–1919: A Book to Commemorate the Fiftieth Anniversary of the T. Eaton Co. Limited, Toronto: The T. Eaton Co. Limited, 1919.

External links
 
 

Buildings and structures in Toronto
Department store buildings in Canada
Eaton's